the global COVID-19 pandemic is still ongoing. In contrast, endemicity is characterized by people continuing to be infected and becoming ill, but in relatively stable numbers.

The observed behavior of the SARS-CoV-2 virus suggests it is unlikely it will die out, and the current lack of a COVID-19 vaccine that provides long-lasting immunity against infection means it cannot immediately be eradicated.

From 2021 onward, politicians and health officials in some countries have said that COVID-19 is endemic or that their country was beginning to transition to an endemic phase. These include Cambodia, Finland, Indonesia, Malaysia, Mexico, the Philippines, Singapore and Vietnam.

Background 
There is no single agreed definition of what it means for COVID-19 to become endemic. What endemicity means has evolved since the 19th century and the desire to label COVID-19 as being endemic in early 2022 was a political and cultural phenomenon connected to a desire to see the pandemic as being over.

During the course of the COVID-19 pandemic, it became apparent that the SARS-CoV-2 virus was unlikely to die out, but was more likely to become endemic. Endemicity is characterized by the continued existence of the virus, but with lower levels of infection than in the preceding epidemic. People continue to become infected because of changes and movement within populations, and endemic disease may have seasonal infection patterns, but the largest determinant of how endemicity manifests itself is the levels of immunity people have, both as a result of vaccination and infection. In the absence of a vaccine that provides long-lasting immunity against infection from COVID-19, it will be impossible to eradicate the disease.

The severity of a disease in an endemic phase depends on how long-lasting immunity against severe outcomes is. If such immunity is lifelong, or lasts longer than immunity against infection, then reinfections will be mild, resulting in a mild endemic phase. In existing human coronaviruses, protection against infection is transient, but observed reinfections are mild.

Coronaviruses display remarkable evolutionary diversification due to mutation and homologous recombination. Like numerous other RNA viruses, coronaviruses frequently recombine during viral genome replication, causing the production of new genetic variants that may influence the future evolutionary paths of SARS-CoV-2.

Global view
On 14 April 2022, the World Health Organization (WHO) said that COVID-19 is far from becoming an endemic disease and could still trigger large outbreaks around the globe.

In June 2022, an article in Human Genomics said that the pandemic was "still raging" but "now is the time to explore the transition from the pandemic to the endemic phase. The latter will require worldwide vigilance and cooperation, especially in emerging countries", and suggested that developed countries should assist in boosting COVID-19 vaccination rates worldwide.

Cambodia 

On 24 January 2022, Hok Kim Cheng, a spokesman for the Cambodian Health Ministry said that Cambodia was entering the endemic stage of the coronavirus.  He cited milder outcomes for Omicron variant infections, and high vaccination rates. The World Health Organization representative in Cambodia, Dr Li Ailan, disagreed, responding: "We are still at the pandemic phase globally including Cambodia".

Finland 

In July 2022, the Finnish Institute for Health and Welfare issued a statement arguing that Finland was transitioning into the endemic phase of COVID-19.

Hong Kong 

On 19 January 2023, Chief Executive John Lee Ka-chiu announced the forthcoming termination of Hong Kong's mandatory isolation rule starting 30 January as part of a decision to downgrade COVID-19 status to an endemic disease.  He stated that the decision was made partly due to high vaccination and infection rates, and mild symptoms in infected persons.  Edwin Tsui, the controller of the Centre for Health Protection said that asymptomatic individuals that are infected can go out freely or return to the workplace, but advised continued quarantining for students and symptomatic individuals.  He stated "we will monitor COVID-19 similar to...influenza" and that "[COVID-19] is an endemic respiratory disease".

Indonesia 

During a press conference on 3 March 2023, Indonesian Health Minister Budi Gunadi Sadikin announced the government has lessened its role in intervening in health programs as the COVID-19 pandemic has turned endemic.  He stated that "[COVID-19 is] the same as the flu. We don't rule it. It’s on the community [if they need to wear a mask or not]" and continued that "people have a bigger role to protect themselves. The responsibility of maintaining health lies on each of them".

Macau 

At a press conference on 5 January 2023, the Macau Health Bureau director Alvis Lo Iek Long stated that COVID-19 has become an endemic disease in Macau, and announced the cancellation of almost all entry curbs and measures.  The statement follows a transition period that began on 8 December with the gradual easing of transmission curbs.

Malaysia

In September 2021, Malaysian Minister of Health Khairy Jamaluddin announced that the government would transition to treating COVID-19 as if it was in an "endemic phase" by the end of October 2021, after vaccinating 80% of the population. In March 2022, Khairy said that Malaysians could start "to live with COVID-19" while maintaining some public health measures.

Netherlands 

On 24 February 2023, the Outbreak Management Team in the Netherlands observed the Omicron variant and its subvariants to be endemic in their 146th set of recommendations since the pandemic began.  The advisory team stated that "measures against COVID-19 should be...in line with the generic measures for the prevention of other infections of the airways".  They dropped recommendations for quarantine, self tests, and mask requirements for healthcare workers.  

On 10 March 2023, Health Minister Ernst Kuipers elected to adopt the recommendations.

Philippines 

In February 2022, the Philippines Department of Health began shifting toward the endemic phase of COVID-19, despite caution from the WHO that it may be too early to declare.  During a media briefing, Health Undersecretary Maria Rosario Vergeire said that the "transition to an endemic state for COVID-19 does not mean that the government would stop its interventions or even remove minimum health protocols such as masking, physical distancing, and hand sanitation."  WHO Acting Philippine Representative Rajendra Yadav said that while the continued drop in the number of new cases is "encouraging," the country should be careful in moving from the "acute phase" of the pandemic.

Singapore 

In June 2021, Gan Kim Yong, Ong Ye Kung and Lawrence Wong—chairs of Singapore's COVID-19 task force—stated that "COVID-19 may never go away", but that due to high vaccination rates, a roadmap was being developed for how the city state could eventually live "normally with [COVID-19] in our midst", and manage it as an endemic disease, which would include:
 Using rapid COVID-19 tests for screening, as opposed to slower PCR tests, contact tracing, and quarantine.
 Deemphasis on COVID-19 case numbers in favour of "outcomes"
 Emphasis on COVID-19 patients being able to recover at home
 Easing restrictions on gatherings and avoiding lockdowns
 Easing travel restrictions for those who are fully-vaccinated

They stated that "Science and human ingenuity will eventually prevail over COVID-19. Cohesion and social consciousness will get us there faster. We must all do our part." Shortly after the plans were revealed, however, outbreaks tied to the Delta variant began to emerge, leading the Singapore government to reintroduce restrictions on gatherings. In October 2021, Prime Minister Lee Hsien Loong admitted that it would take at least six months to reach a "new normal", but that Singapore's high vaccination rates and low mortality meant that COVID-19 "has become a treatable, mild disease for most of us", the impact of COVID-19 variants had made a COVID-Zero strategy less feasible, and that maintaining restrictions would impact the economy and mental health of the country.

United States 

On April 26, 2022, Chief Medical Advisor to the President and director of the National Institute of Allergy and Infectious Diseases (NIAID) Anthony Fauci argued that the United States was "out of the pandemic phase". The following day, Fauci stated that the country was in a "transitional phase" into "hopefully a more controlled phase and endemicity", but that "the world is still in a pandemic", and the United States could still see new waves of infection.  Fauci's comments followed a report from the CDC indicating that the United States had a much higher level of collective immunity due to the Omicron variant.

See also 
 Public health mitigation of COVID-19
 COVID-19 pandemic by country and territory
 Treatment and management of COVID-19

References 

COVID-19
National responses to the COVID-19 pandemic
Medical responses to the COVID-19 pandemic
Political responses to the COVID-19 pandemic